María de Jesús Mendoza Sánchez (born 13 June 1970) is a Mexican politician from the National Action Party. From 2011 to 2012 she served as Deputy of the LXI Legislature of the Mexican Congress representing Oaxaca.

References

1970 births
Living people
People from Oaxaca
Women members of the Chamber of Deputies (Mexico)
National Action Party (Mexico) politicians
21st-century Mexican politicians
21st-century Mexican women politicians
Deputies of the LXI Legislature of Mexico
Members of the Chamber of Deputies (Mexico) for Oaxaca